Argyle is an unincorporated community in  Casey County, Kentucky, United States. It's post office  is no longer in service.

References

Unincorporated communities in Casey County, Kentucky
Unincorporated communities in Kentucky